is a Japanese anime screenwriter and director.

Productions worked on
Bonobono: Storyboard, Episode Director
Chocchan's Story: Director, Screenplay
Descendants of Darkness: Director, Storyboard (ep. 1)
Galaxy Angel A: Screenplay (eps. 9B, 11A, 17A)
Mamotte! Lollipop: Series Composition, Script (ep. 1)
Master Keaton: Storyboard (ep. 7)
Miracle Girls: Director (eps. 30–51), Script (ep. 43), Storyboard (ep. 30)
Mirage of Blaze: Series Composition, Script (eps. 1, 5, 7, 10, 13), Series Formation
Mizuiro Jidai: Director
Nazca: Director, Storyboard, Technical Director
Peach Girl: Series Composition, Screenplay (eps. 1, 6, 11, 17, 20, 23)
School Rumble: Series Composition, Script (eps. 1, 5, 9, 17, 19, 26)
School Rumble Nigakki: Series Composition, Script (eps. 1, 5–7, 14, 16, 20, 25–26)
School Rumble OVA Ichigakki Hoshu: Series Composition, Script (eps. 1–2)
Sensual Phrase: Series Director
Suzuka: Series Composition, Script (eps. 1–2, 5, 8, 12, 15, 17, 19–20, 25–26)
Tenshi Nanka Ja Nai: Director
Touch: Series Director
Tsukihime, Lunar Legend: Script (eps. 1–12), Series Story Editor
Ultra Nyan: Hoshizora Kara Maiorita Fushigi Neko: Director, Storyboard
Ultra Nyan 2: Happy Daisakusen: Director, Storyboard
X: Script (eps. 20, 23–24)
YAWARA! a fashionable judo girl!: Director, Storyboard (eps. 1, 15, 23, 27, 44, 54–55, 75, 90, 124), Episode Director (eps. 1, 15, 23, 27, 44, 54–55, 75, 90, 124)
Yawara! Soreyuke Koshinuke Kiss!!: Director, Storyboard

References

External links
 

1956 births
Living people
Anime directors